Rhamnus may refer to:
 Rhamnus (city), or Rhamnous, an ancient Greek city in Attica
 Rhamnus (Crete), or Rhamnous, an ancient Greek town in Crete
 Rhamnus, an augur killed by Nisus and Euryalus in book IX of The Aeneid
 Rhamnus (plant) or buckthorns, a plant genus
 9316 Rhamnus, a main-belt asteroid discovered in 1988
 Mount Rhamnus, a mountain in Antarctica